Friday's Child is a novel written by Georgette Heyer in 1944. It is generally considered one of Miss Heyer's best Regency romances, and was reportedly the favourite of the author herself. Heyer retained only a single fan letter, which was from a Romanian political prisoner who kept herself and her fellow prisoners sane for twelve years by telling and retelling the plot of Friday's Child.

Friday's Child is one of several Heyer romances where the hero and heroine are married early in the novel, and the plot follows their path to mutual love and understanding. Other examples include The Convenient Marriage and April Lady.

Plot summary

The wild young Viscount Sheringham is fast running through his considerable income through gambling and other extravagant pursuits; and he cannot as yet touch the principal, unless he marries.  As the lady with whom he currently fancies himself in love, the beautiful Isabella Milborne, is also an heiress, he proposes.

Isabella rejects him unhesitatingly, citing his dissipated lifestyle.  A lively quarrel then follows with his obnoxious widowed mother and her brother, who wish to retain control of his father's fortune themselves.  The Viscount storms off in a fit of pique, vowing to marry the first female he meets.

This turns out to be the pretty but orphaned and shy Hero Wantage, who has secretly loved him since they were children, and who now lives with one of his neighbours in the position of Cinderella, complete with Ugly Sisters.

The rest of the novel, chronicling the Viscount's gradual transition to maturity and the realisation that the one he really loves is Hero (the "loving and giving" child of the title), is told with Miss Heyer's characteristic wit, and features some of her most memorable dialogue, plot twists and characters (such as the fiery but lovelorn George Wrotham, whose hobby is fighting duels).

Characters in Friday's Child

Major characters
Anthony Verelst, Viscount Sheringham (Sherry), the hero
Hero Wantage (Kitten), the heroine
Gilbert (Gil) Ringwood, Sherry's closest friend
Hon. Ferdinand (Ferdy) Fakenham, Sherry's cousin and friend
George, Lord Wrotham  , hot-tempered friend of Sherry and suitor to Isabella Milborne
Isabella Milborne (the Incomparable), beauty who rejects Sherry

Minor characters
Valeria, Lady Sheringham, dowager Viscountess, Sherry's widowed mother
Horace Paulett, Sherry's maternal uncle and trustee
Hon. Prosper Verelst, Sherry's paternal uncle and trustee
the Bagshot family: Mrs Jane Bagshot, Mr Humphrey Bagshot and their children, Edwin, Cassandra (Cassy), Eudora & Sophronia (Sophy); Mrs Bagshot is cousin and guardian to Hero Wantage
Sir Montagu (Monty) Revesby, friend of Sherry
Duke of Severn, suitor to Isabella Milborne
Lady Saltash, grandmother of Gil Ringwood, resident in Bath
Mr & Mrs Milborne, Isabella's parents
Hon. Marmaduke (Duke) Fakenham, brother of Ferdy Fakenham
Lord & Lady Fakenham, Lady Fairford, Ferdy Fakenham's parents and sister
Jasper Tarleton, Bath gentleman, suitor of Hero
Ruth Wimborne, cast-off mistress of Sir Montagu Revesby
Flyaway Nancy, former mistress of Sherry
Mr Tooting, a Cit, rescuer of Hero
Mrs Charlotte Gillingham, gaming house proprietress
Lady (Sally) Royston, female whip
Mrs Theresa Hoby, Gussie Yarford (Lady Appleby), friends of Hero
Sir Matthew Brockenhurst (Brock), Sir Barnabas Crawley, Algernon Gumley, Mr Kilby, Assheton Smith, Mr Jack Westgate, Hon. Wilfred Yarford, society gentlemen
Mrs Drummond Burrell, Lady Jersey, Lady Sefton, society ladies and Patronesses of Almack's Assembly Rooms.
General Crawley, Sir Carlton Frome, Bath gentlemen
Mr Chalfont, Misses Chalfont, Bath visitors
Mr Guynette, Master of Ceremonies at Bath Lower Rooms
Bootle (Sherry's valet), Bradgate & Mrs Bradgate (butler & cook at Half Moon Street), Chilham (Gil Ringwood's valet), Ditchling (Sheringham servant), Mr Ford (Gil Ringwood's landlord), Goring & Mrs Goring (staff at Sherry's Melton Mowbray hunting box), Groombridge & Mrs Groombridge (butler & cook at Half Moon Street), Jason (Sherry's tiger), John (Sherry's coachman), Maria (Hero's abigail), Mr Philip Stoke (Sheringham man of business), Varley (butler at Sheringham House)
Pug (Lady Saltash's pug-dog) and a canary

Footnotes

1944 British novels
Novels by Georgette Heyer
Historical novels
Heinemann (publisher) books
Regency romance novels